Farmers' Bank of Delaware was the second bank chartered by Delaware. It operated from 1807 until 1981, when it was on the verge of bank failure and was acquired by Girard Bank. At that time, the bank had 28 branches. For most of its existence, the bank was 49% owned by the state government, although it was privately managed.

History
On February 4, 1807, the Delaware General Assembly passed legislation allowing the Farmers' Bank to incorporate and issue $500,000 of capital, via 10,000 shares at $50 each. The bank was incorporated by Henry M. Ridgely in Dover, with branches in New Castle and Georgetown. Established to provide banking and credit services to farmers in Kent and Sussex Counties, the bank also ended the 12 years of monopoly enjoyed by the National Bank of Delaware in banking services in the state.

A supplementary charter on January 22, 1813, added a fourth branch in Wilmington.

In 1816, the Second Bank of the United States selected the bank as a local depository for federal revenues.

In 1837, the bank was selected as the depository for the federal surplus.

In 1899, the branch in New Castle was closed after the city went into decline.

In February 1976, the bank held merger talks with Girard Bank.

In 1976, the state of Delaware increased its ownership from 49% to 80% after the bank lost $20.8 million in 1975 and the Federal Deposit Insurance Corporation (FDIC) noted that it would cost more to liquidate the bank than to inject capital. As part of the deal between Governor Sherman W. Tribbitt and the FDIC, the state of Delaware agreed to keep all its deposits in the bank.

On December 20, 1981, when the bank was on the verge bank failure, it was acquired by Girard Bank for $38.6 million, which required the passage of a special statute that allowed the Pennsylvania-based Girard Bank to acquire a Delaware bank. Girard Bank was acquired by Mellon Bank in 1984 and was sold in 2001 to Citizens Financial Group.

Management history
Among the presidents of the bank were:
 Henry M. Ridgely (1807-)
 Allan Thomson (October 22, 1831, to January 7, 1836)
 James A. Bayard Jr. (January 7, 1836, to January 5, 1843)
 David C. Wilson (January 5, 1843, to March 31, 1865)
 Charles I. du Pont (April 6, 1866, to December 12, 1868)
 Francis Barry (January 7, 1868, to January 8, 1878)
 George Richardson (January 3, 1878, to at least 1888)

References

1807 establishments in Delaware
Banks established in 1807
Dover, Delaware
Defunct banks of the United States